Gayle Conelly Manchin (born June 20, 1947) is an American educator and government official who was the First Lady of West Virginia from 2005 to 2010 and is the current Federal Co-Chair of the Appalachian Regional Commission. Manchin previously served as the president of the West Virginia Board of Education from 2013 to 2014 and West Virginia Secretary of Education and the Arts from 2017 until her termination in March 2018. She is the wife of former governor and current U.S. Senator Joe Manchin of West Virginia.

Early life and education
Gayle Manchin was raised in Beckley, West Virginia and graduated from Woodrow Wilson High School. She received both her Bachelor of Arts in language arts and education, and a Master of Arts in reading (now known as the masters in literacy education), from West Virginia University. In 1999, she received a second master's degree in educational technology leadership from Salem International University.

Career

Manchin has worked as a teacher in the Marion County Public School district and a faculty member at Fairmont State University, where she established the university's inaugural Community Service Learning Program.

She has also served as Director of the AmeriCorps Promise Fellow Program in West Virginia. Additionally, Manchin worked for the Office of Secretary of Education and the Arts, where she established the West Virginia Partnerships to Assure Student Success initiative (WV PASS).

Gayle Manchin held the position of First Lady of West Virginia from 2005 until 2010 during her husband's term as the state's governor. During her tenure as First Lady, Manchin simultaneously served as the chairperson of the West Virginia Citizen’s Council on Children and Families and Governor’s Healthy Lifestyles Coalition, co-chair of the Governor’s 21st Century Jobs Cabinet and the Intellectual Infrastructure of Vision Shared, and a member of the West Virginia Commission for National and Community Service.

In 2007, Manchin was appointed to the West Virginia Board of Education from 2007 to 2015. She served two terms as the Board of Education's vice president. On July 10, 2013, Manchin was elected President of the West Virginia Board of Education for a two-year term.

In 2016, Manchin was the subject of some controversy when USA Today, a national newspaper, published an article noting that Manchin, upon becoming Board of Education president in 2012, spearheaded a campaign for states to require schools to purchase EpiPens and other medical supplies. Eleven states created laws to require schools to stock EpiPens, made by Mylan pharmaceuticals, leading to a "near monopoly" of Mylan's epinephrine autoinjector in the school health sector. The article noted the potential for a conflict of interest, as Mylan's CEO, Heather Bresch, is Manchin's daughter.

West Virginia Secretary of Education and the Arts
Incoming Governor of West Virginia Jim Justice appointed Manchin to his cabinet as the state's Secretary of Education and the Arts on January 13, 2017. Manchin succeeded outgoing Secretary of Education Kay Goodwin, who was retiring from the office. The Secretary for Education and the Arts oversees a collection of six state agencies, including West Virginia Public Broadcasting, the West Virginia Library Commission, the Division of Culture and History, Volunteer West Virginia, the state Center for Professional Development, and the Division of Rehabilitation Services.

After the passage of HB 4006, a bill that would dissolve the West Virginia Department of Education and the Arts, in the West Virginia Legislature, Manchin called on Justice to veto the legislation. Manchin also offered to resign and "remove any political cloud," though days later, she was removed from office by Justice, leaving the office of Department Secretary vacant.

USCIRF
On April 19, 2018, Manchin was appointed to the United States Commission on International Religious Freedom (USCIRF). As Vice Chair, she has spoken out on behalf of Iranian prisoner, Mohammad Ali Taheri. After the January 27, 2019, bombing of the Jolo Cathedral in the Philippines, in an interview on EWTN News Nightly, she expressed disapproval of Rodrigo Duterte's prior "angry, violent language" against Church leaders. In March 2021, Gayle, who had moved to the role of Chair, was sanctioned by the Chinese government over the USCIRF recommendation that the United States government and its partners sanction Chinese officials involved in human rights abuses committed on the Uyghur minority in Xinjiang. Manchin said that she was "flattered" by the sanctions.

Personal life 
In 1967, Gayle Conelly married Joe Manchin, with whom she had three children, Heather, Joseph IV, and Brooke, and settled in Fairmont, West Virginia.

See also
Governor of West Virginia
West Virginia Governor's Mansion

References

Living people
1947 births
State cabinet secretaries of West Virginia
First Ladies and Gentlemen of West Virginia
Educators from West Virginia
American women educators
Women in West Virginia politics
West Virginia Democrats
Fairmont State University faculty
Manchin family
West Virginia University alumni
Salem International University alumni
Woodrow Wilson High School (Beckley, West Virginia) alumni
Politicians from Beckley, West Virginia
Politicians from Fairmont, West Virginia